Mirro Roder (January 22, 1944 – July 9, 2021) was an American football placekicker who played three seasons in the National Football League. He played three seasons for the Chicago Bears, and two games for the expansion Tampa Bay Buccaneers in 1976 and missed all three field goals that he attempted with them. He was the first Czechoslovakian-born player in the NFL (the town in which he was born is now part of the modern-day Czech Republic). Original name Miroslav Rödr.

Mirro's daughter lives in the same Riverside, IL home he bought when he kicked for the Bears. After retiring he moved back to Czechoslovakia and got remarried. He died on July 9, 2021, at 77.

1944 births
2021 deaths
Czech players of American football
Czechoslovak emigrants to the United States
American football placekickers
Chicago Bears players
Tampa Bay Buccaneers players
Sportspeople from Olomouc